= Helyn Hitchcock =

American author and numerologist

Helyn Gerberding Hitchcock was a writer of books about numerology, including the belief that turning the letters of names into numbers can divine hidden information about those objects.

Her publications include Helping Yourself with Numerology (1972), The Magic of Psychograms (1975) and Your Number, Please (1945).

Hitchcock was born in Fort Wayne, Indiana and received an undergraduate degree from the University of Michigan in 1927. In August 1927, she married Ivan N. Hitchcock, and they had two children.
